is a Japanese former cyclist. He competed in the team pursuit at the 1992 Summer Olympics.

References

External links
 

1969 births
Living people
Japanese male cyclists
Olympic cyclists of Japan
Cyclists at the 1992 Summer Olympics
Sportspeople from Miyagi Prefecture
Japanese track cyclists
20th-century Japanese people